CSS  Phoenix was a Confederate ironclad floating battery built at Selma, Alabama, from 1863–64.

Huntsville
Phoenix was built at the Confederate Naval Works at Selma in 1863 and launched in March 1864. She was severely damaged during the launching and subsequently could not be used as a warship. She was brought to Mobile and scuttled by Confederate forces at the Dog River Bar in Mobile Bay on August 7, 1864. The Confederates then burned her to the waterline. The wreck was located in 1985 and determined to be well preserved.

References

Bibliography
 
 

Ironclad floating batteries of the Confederate States Navy
Alabama in the American Civil War
Ships built in Selma, Alabama
1864 ships
Shipwrecks of the American Civil War
Shipwrecks of the Alabama coast
Shipwrecks in rivers
Scuttled vessels
Ship fires
Maritime incidents in August 1864